Uttarapalli Assembly constituency was a constituency of the Andhra Pradesh Legislative Assembly, India. It is one of 9 constituencies in the Vizianagaram district.

Overview
It was a part of the Vizianagaram Lok Sabha constituency along with another six Vidhan Sabha segments, namely, Rajam, Etcherla, Bobbili, Cheepurupalli, Nellimarla and Vizianagaram.

Members of Legislative Assembly
 1978 - Kakarlapudi Vijaya Raghava Satyanarayana Padmanabha Raju, Indian National Congress
 1983 - Kolla Appala Naidu, Telugu Desam Party
 1985 - Kolla Appala Naidu, Telugu Desam Party
 1989 - Kolla Appala Naidu, Telugu Desam Party
 1994 - Kolla Appala Naidu, Telugu Desam Party
 1999 - Kolla Appala Naidu, Telugu Desam Party
 2004 - Pudi Mangapathi Rao, Indian National Congress

See also
 List of constituencies of Andhra Pradesh Legislative Assembly

References

Vizianagaram
Former assembly constituencies of Andhra Pradesh